Apgar is one of the main villages in Glacier National Park. Apgar is located on the west side of the park about one mile in from the West Entrance. Apgar has one of the most popular campgrounds in Glacier Park, and is always quite filled. It is also home to a visitors' center, a general store, and a large gift shop. It also is the starting point for almost all Red Jammer bus tours on the Going-to-the-Sun Road. Apgar's campground is connected to the village by a road, and a bike path through the woods, in which smaller wildlife can be seen, though Grizzly bears have been seen close to camp.

History
Apgar takes its name from Milo Apgar, an early settler in the Lake McDonald area. In the 1890s, Apgar, along with Frank Geduhn and Charlie Howe, built homes at the lower end of the lake with the intention of farming the area.  Farming proved impractical, so they and other settlers quickly became involved in servicing tourists visiting the park. As these services increased, the village that grew up around them gained the name Apgar.

Apgar has two small hotel buildings operated by the same company. It also has its own boat launching ramp, and a boat rental dock on its portion of Lake McDonald. Apgar is within a twenty-minute drive from the Lake McDonald Lodge. The summer home of famed western artist Charles M. Russell, Bull Head Lodge, was located in Apgar. As a young man, artist Ace Powell was also a resident of the village.

Notable people
 Charles M. Russell
 Ace Powell

See also
 List of Glacier National Park (U.S.) related articles

References

Glacier National Park (U.S.)
Populated places in Flathead County, Montana
1890s establishments in Montana
Populated places established in the 1890s